Ifelodun may refer to :

Ifelodun, Kwara State, a Local Government Area in Nigeria
Ifelodun, Osun State, a Local Government Area in Nigeria
Irepodun/Ifelodun, a Local Government Area of Ekiti State, Nigeria